Zakia Kohzad (Persian: ذكيه كهزاد) is a former TV news anchor for Kabul TV. Zakia was born in Mazar-e-Sharif, Afghanistan. By 1980, Zakia had secured a job as an anchor on Kabul TV. In 1992, she and her family emigrated to India and, subsequently in 2000, to the United States.  She resides in exile in California, U.S.A. with her husband Youssof Kohzad.

References

Living people
1950 births
Afghan television presenters
Afghan women television presenters
Afghan expatriates in the United States
Afghan exiles
People from Mazar-i-Sharif